Tarzali is a rural town and locality in the Tablelands Region, Queensland, Australia.

Geography 
The locality is on the Atherton Tableland. It is bounded to the east by the Johnstone River, to the south-east and south by Dirran Creek, and to the north-west by Seamark Road. The town is located in the centre of the locality. The Millaa Millaa Malanda Road enters the locality from the north (Jaggan), passes through the town, and exits to the south-west (Minbun).

The land use around the town centre is residential. In the rest of the locality, the predominant land use is grazing on native vegetation.

History 
The town takes its name from the Tarzali railway station on the Millaa Milla branch of the Tablelands railway line. The name Tarzali is said to be an Aboriginal word meaning water gum, Syzygium gustavioides. The railway station was in use from 1915 to 1964.

The Millaa Millaa branch railway line from Tolga opened to Tarzali on 15 December 1916 with the town being served by Tarzali railway station. The line was opened through to Millaa Millaa on 19 December 1921. The line has now closed and the Tarzali railway station has been dismantled.

In April 1914, a tent school was approved for Dirran (the name of the parish) on the land of Mr William's selection until a state school could be constructed. Dirran State School opened on 3 May 1915. On 21 October 1918, it was renamed Tarzali State School. It closed on 31 December 1967. The school was at Millaa Millaa Malanda Road.

Education 
There are no schools in Tarzali. The nearest government primary schools are Malanda State School in Malanda to the north and Millaa Millaa State School in neighbouring Millaa Millaa to the south. The nearest government secondary school is Malanda State High School in Malanda to the north.

References

Further reading

External links 

 
 

Towns in Queensland
Tablelands Region
Localities in Queensland